Graeme Whitnall (25 April 1952 – 5 August 2021) was an Australian rules footballer who played with Carlton in the Victorian Football League (VFL). His son, Lance, played over 200 games for Carlton and won the best and fairest in 2006.

References

External links 

Graeme Whitnall's profile at Blueseum

1952 births
2021 deaths
Carlton Football Club players
Maryborough Football Club players
Australian rules footballers from Victoria (Australia)